The 2016 British Figure Skating Championships were held from 1–6 December 2015 in Sheffield. Medals were awarded in the disciplines of men's singles, ladies' singles, pair skating, and ice dance at the senior, junior, and novice levels. The results were among the criteria used to determine international assignments.

Medallists

Senior

Junior

Senior results

Senior men

Senior ladies

Senior pairs

Senior ice dance

International team selections

World Championships
The 2016 World Figure Skating Championships were held in Boston, United States from 28 March–3 April 2016.

World Junior Championships
The 2016 World Junior Figure Skating Championships were held in Debrecen, Hungary from 14 to 20 March 2016.

References

External links
2016 British Championships results

British Figure Skating Championships, 2016
British Figure Skating Championships
Figure Skating Championships